Actia jocularis is an eastern Palearctic species of fly in the family Tachinidae.

Distribution
Japan.

References

jocularis
Diptera of Asia
Insects described in 1957